The Allaiwal is a tribe of Swati origin which inhabits the lands north of Nandhiar (Batagram) and south of Kohistan - in Pakistan. In the 19th century they fought battles against the British with the Hazara Expedition of 1888 resulting in the destruction of the important Allaiwal village of Pokal on 3 November 1888.

References

Swati Pashtun tribes
Social groups of Pakistan
Pashto-language surnames
Pakistani names